Mashore may refer to:

 Clyde Mashore (born 1945), former Major League Baseball outfielder who played for the Cincinnati Reds and Montreal Expos
 Damon Mashore (born 1969), Puerto Rico-born former Major League Baseball outfielder who played for the Oakland Athletics and Anaheim Angels, son of Clyde